The Methodist Church in Ireland (Ulster-Scots: Methody Kirk in Airlann) is a Wesleyan Methodist church that operates across both Northern Ireland and the Republic of Ireland on an all-Ireland basis. It is the fourth-largest Christian denomination in Northern Ireland. The Irish Methodist Church has close links with the Methodist Church in Britain.

For the year ending 31 December 2012, there were 105 Methodist ministers, 227 local preachers and over six hundred lay people in leadership positions serving over 200 congregations, which combine to form a total community of 49,394 people. The governing body of the Methodist Church in Ireland is the annual Conference.

History
Methodism was founded in England by John Wesley and his younger brother Charles Wesley during the 18th century, initially as a movement within the Church of England. John Wesley visited Ireland on twenty-one occasions between 1747 and 1789.

Wesleyan theology remained close to the Anglican criteria of scripture, tradition and reason. It has been suggested that nobody who lived in the 18th century has influenced more people in the years since than John Wesley, and in the dissemination of that influence Irish people have played a significant role.

Methodist belief
The Methodist Church as part of the worldwide church shares those core beliefs which it believes to have been passed down from the time of the Apostles. Those beliefs are founded on the Bible and are summed up in the creeds, which are regularly used in Christian services of all denominations.

It is widely considered that the Protestant Reformation focused on three main matters of belief: the supreme authority of scripture; salvation by faith through faith in Christ, and; the priesthood of all believers. The Methodist Church affirms the importance of these matters.

John Wesley (the founder of Methodism) believed that certain aspects of the Christian Faith required special emphasis. Methodists today still hold to these emphases, known to them as, the 'Four Alls':

 All need to be saved – "All have sinned and fall short of the glory of God" (Romans 3:23) – Sin is a deep-seated self-seeking from which no-one is immune.
 All can be saved – We can be saved from the consequences of our sin through the work of Jesus Christ on the cross. This is a Gospel ('good news') for everyone – "God sent the Son into the world... that the world might be saved through him" (John 3:17)
 All may know themselves saved – through the promises in scripture, the intense conviction of God's graciousness to us individually, and a different outlook on life leading to a changed quality of living – "If you confess with your mouth, 'Jesus is Lord', and believe in your heart that God raised him from the dead, you will be saved." (Romans 10:9)
 All may be completely saved – there can be no limits on what God can do in our lives, as we are continually becoming more and more perfect in love for God and also our fellow humans

Structure

The Methodist Church in Ireland works on a democratic structure. There are no bishops or ordained hierarchy. Authority in the Church is vested in the Conference and the trustees.

Classes
The small group (or 'class') has long been an organisational mainstay of Methodism. While now operating under a number of different names, such as Alpha Home groups, prayer triplets, or Bible studies, their essential purpose remains the same: the mutual encouragement and strengthening of church members through close fellowship.

Societies and circuits
These small groups gather, along with other people, to worship together on Sunday and "to work and witness in the community throughout the week". These congregations (or 'societies') can be linked with up to six or seven other congregations in the local area to form a 'circuit'. The direction of a circuit is guided by the Circuit Executive, composed of one senior minister ('Circuit Superintendent'), other ministers, local preachers and a group of leaders from the member congregations.

Districts
There are 73 Methodist circuits on the island of Ireland, which have been gathered into eight 'districts' to co-ordinate and motivate at a more general geographical level. Each district appoints a Superintendent and a Secretary to oversee the work and provide pastoral support to clergy.

Conference
The annual Conference is usually held over the second weekend of June each year. There are several boards and departments which work at the Connexional level to serve individuals and the Methodist Church in Ireland as a whole. Each year Conference elects an administrative and representative president for 12 months.

Social action and education
The Methodist Church has made a large contribution to Ireland both through education and social action.

Social action
The church has an emphasis on social action in society. One of the church's mottoes is that the organisation is "Friends of all, enemies of none". The Methodist Church maintains a number of "City Missions". Work carried out by the City Missions includes listening services, homeless help, retirement and nursing homes and various other self-help groups. Strongly emphasised is that the relief of social and personal needs are addressed irrespective of creed. The Methodist Church attempts to make a proactive contribution to society as a whole through its Council on Social Responsibility, World Development & Relief Committee and Home missions department. The Church can also claim a positive contribution to the peace process in Northern Ireland.

Education

The Methodist Church maintains two large secondary schools in Ireland, one north and one south. Methodist College Belfast has made a significant contribution to the life of Ireland and internationally, with some distinguished past pupils including Ernest Walton. Its counterpart in the Republic, Wesley College Dublin has a similar reputation. Famous past pupils of Wesley include George Bernard Shaw and Senator Gordon Wilson. The Methodist Church also maintains a number of primary schools in both the Republic and Northern Ireland.

In addition to these schools the church also maintains a theological college at Edgehill which has been in existence for over 80 years. Edgehill Theological College is a constituent college of the Queen's University, Belfast and provides a series of undergraduate and postgraduate degrees in theology, part-time courses in faith and worship and other areas of church life as well as correspondence courses and seminars. Edgehill is the ministerial training college for the Methodist Church in Ireland. The church also owns an agricultural college in the Republic of Ireland called Gurteen College.

Children's and youth work
Methodism has a long tradition of organised youth work, currently instigated and supported by the Irish Methodist Youth and Children's Department [IMYC] (formerly Department of Youth and Children's Work). The first full-time general secretary was appointed over thirty years ago. IMYC exists to establish links between the Church and children and young people, so that every generation in the church's life is appreciated and listened to. This involves representing and advocating youth and children's issues within the whole life of the Church as well as providing training to ministers and youth and children's workers.

The current general secretary is Gillian Gilmore, and her predecessors have included: Rev Dr David Rock, Rev David Neilands; Rev Dr Johnston McMaster, Rev Winston Good and Rev John Knox, the department's first general secretary. Current members of staff are: Dani Lorimer (Office Administrator), Lisa Best, & Gemma Barclay (Youth Ministry), Amy Anderson (Communications) & Leanne Hill (Training & Development). Previous members of staff include: Rev Dr Janet Unsworth, Jill McVitty, Kerry Scarlett, Janette McCormick, Nicky Blair and Raymond Ruttle (Children's Ministry) Rev Dr Julian Hamilton & Stephen McCann (Youth Ministry) and Sadie Bamford, Tara Crawford, Sharon Heath, Tina Barnett, Wendy Johnston & Liza Wiseman (Office Administrators).

It offers a year out discipleship and evangelism programme known as Team on Mission (TOM) which is currently in its 31st year, members including Amy McSharry, Sara Fullerton and Aaron Sweeney; TOM succeeded the older programme known as Youth Evangelism Team (YET). The department also runs a number of flagship events such as Follow the Star (an interactive prayer room for under 8s), Soul Mates (For ages 9–13), Overflow (for young leaders aged 15+) and Autumn Soul (for ages 13+).

The Methodist Newsletter
The Methodist Newsletter is a newsletter produced by the Methodist Church in Ireland every month (except August).

Contribution to Northern Ireland

Eric Gallagher is an example of Methodist people who have made an arguably enormous contribution to the peace process in Northern Ireland. As president of the Methodist Church in Ireland he was the first Protestant churchman who met with IRA representatives in Feakle, County Clare in the 1970s to unsuccessfully try to broker a peace. The meeting was broken up by the Garda Síochána, but the fugitive IRA men had already left.

Gordon Wilson
Further commitment to the Peace Process was achieved from seeming tragedy in 1987. Gordon Wilson, a member of the Church was the father of Marie Wilson, one of 11 victims of the Enniskillen Remembrance Sunday Parade bombing by the Provisional IRA. He came to national and international prominence with an emotional television interview he gave to the BBC the same evening in which he described his last conversation with his daughter, a nurse, as they both lay buried in rubble.

Wilson declared at the end of his interview that he forgave his daughter's killers and urged loyalist paramilitaries not to take revenge for her death. This was seen as a turning point in the peace process, that somebody so soon after such a disaster was able to forgive his own daughter's murderers. His contribution was honoured when he was invited to take a seat in Seanad Éireann by request of the Taoiseach in 1993.

In 2005, The Church was once again thrown into the centre of the Peace Process as a former president of The Methodist Church in Ireland, Rev Harold Good, was asked to be an independent witness for the historic decommissioning of IRA arms.

Ecumenical relations
The Methodist Church is a member of several ecumenical bodies, including the World Council of Churches, the Conference of European Churches, Churches Together in Britain and Ireland, and the Irish Council of Churches.

Into the future
In 1998 The Methodist Church in Ireland embarked on a period of reflection on its position within Irish Society which it called 'Dreaming Dreams'. Although in many areas of the country the Church is increasing in numbers it is aware that as a whole numbers are decreasing in church membership across the country in every denomination.

The church has since published its 'ConneXions' plan. The core vision of ConneXions is that each local Church will reflect the life of Christ in its own area. Each church was asked to participate in a community survey so as to find a policy in each church which will best match the needs of its locality. The Methodist Church hopes that this plan when fully implemented will put the entire connexion in a strong position for regrowth and redevelopment in the 21st Century whilst holding fast to the emphasises of the Wesleyan tradition on which it was formed.

In 2002 The Methodist Church in Ireland signed a covenant for greater cooperation and potential ultimate unity with the Church of Ireland.

Presidents of the Methodist Church of Ireland

 Rev. John Arthur Walton (father of Nobel Physics prize winner Ernest Walton)
 Rev. John Robertson (1929)
 Rev. William Henry Massey (1936–1937), died in office.
 Rev. W. E. Morley Thompson (1948–1949)
 Rev. Eric Gallagher (1967)
 Rev. Sydney Frame (1985–1986)
 Rev. William I Hamilton (1986–1987)
 Rev. George Morrison (1987–1988)
 Rev. Stanley Whittington (1988–1989)
 Rev. Ken Best (1996–1997)
 Rev. Dr. Norman Taggart (1997–1998)
 Rev. David Kerr (1999–2000)
 Rev. S. Kenneth Todd (2000–2001)
 Rev. Dr. Harold Good OBE (2001–2002)
 Rev. Winston Graham (2002–2003)
 Rev. Jim Rea MBE (2003–2004)
 Rev. Dr. Brian Fletcher (2004–2005)
 Rev. Desmond Bain (2005–2006)
 Rev. Ivan McElhinney (2006–2007)
 Rev. Roy Cooper (2007–2008)
 Rev. Aian Ferguson (2008–2009)
 Rev. Donald P. Ker (2009–2010)
 Rev. Paul Kingston (2010–2011)
 Rev. Ian D. Henderson (2011–2012)
 Rev. Kenneth Lindsay (2012–2013)
 Rev. Dr. Heather Morris (2013–2014), the first woman to hold the position.
 Rev. Peter Murray (2014–2015)
 Rev. Brian Anderson (2015–2016)
 Rev. Bill Mullaly (2016–2017)
 Rev. Dr. Laurence Graham (2017–2018)
 Rev. William Davison (2018–2019)
 Rev. Sam McGuffin (2019–2020)
 Rev. Tom McKnight (2020–2021)
 Rev. Dr Sahr Yambasu (2021–), the first non-white person to lead one of the Four Main Churches in Ireland.
 Rev. David Nixon (2022–2023)
 Rev. David Turtle (2023–2024), President Elect

Gallery

See also

 History of Christianity in Ireland

References

External links

 
Methodist denominations
Members of the World Council of Churches
Religious organizations established in 1784

Protestantism in Ireland
Protestantism in the United Kingdom